Alok Kumar Rai (born 20 January 1976) is a professor of marketing at the Banaras Hindu University, India. Currently, he is the 41st vice-chancellor of University of Lucknow. He is one of the youngest vice-chancellors of Lucknow University.

Education & career 
Rai is a B.Sc. graduate of Allahabad University, MBA from the Banaras Hindu University, and PhD from VBS Purvanchal University. 

Alok Kumar Rai is a full-time professor of Institute of Management Studies, Banaras Hindu University. Currently, he is on appointment as the vice-chancellor of University of Lucknow. He has also held additional charge vice-chancellor of Sampurnanand Sanskrit Vishwavidyalaya. and Bhimrao Ambedkar University, Agra.

On 30 December 2022, Rai was given a second term of three years as the vice-chancellor of Lucknow University.

In February 2023, he was given the additional charge as the vice chancellor of APJ Abdul Kalam Technical University (AKTU), Lucknow.

Publications 
Rai has published several famous textbooks, some of which are:

Research 
 Rai on GoogleScholar

References 

Living people
1976 births
Academic staff of Banaras Hindu University
 People from Ghazipur
Academic staff of the University of Lucknow
University of Allahabad alumni
Banaras Hindu University alumni